Theodore Friedmann (born June 16, 1935) is an American researcher most noted for his work in human gene therapy.

Early life and education
He was born in Vienna.  His family emigrated to the United States when he was a young child.  Friedmann received his A.B in 1956 and M.D. in 1960 from the University of Pennsylvania. He received an M.A. from the University of Oxford in 1995, where he was the Newton-Abraham Visiting Professor in 1996.

Career and research
After his MD, he worked at the Children's Hospital Medical Center, Boston, Massachusetts from 1960 to 1962, and the US Air Force 10th Tac. Hospital in Alconbury, England from 1962 to 1963. He then worked as a research fellow in colloid science at the University of Cambridge from 1963 to 1964 before returning to Boston, where he was also a teaching and research fellow at Harvard University. He worked at the National Institutes of Health from 1965 to 1968, and then joined the University of California, San Diego where he was assistant professor, promoted to associate professor in 1973 and professor in 1981.

He is a past president of the American Society for Gene Therapy (now the American Society for Gene and Cell Therapy).

He also served as the first chair of WADA's Gene Doping Expert Group, from its establishment in 2004  to 2019 

He was awarded the Japan Prize in 2015 'for the proposal of the concept of gene therapy and its clinical applications.

Awards
 The Award of Merit from National Institutes of Health (NIH) 2003
 Japan Prize 2015
 Distinguished Graduate Award, University of Pennsylvania, 2006
 Austrian Cross of Honour for Science and Art, 1996
 H.C. Jacobæus Prize of the Nordic Research Committee and Nordic Insulin Foundation, 1995

Selected publications
 Friedmann, Theodore, and Richard Roblin. "Gene therapy for human genetic disease?." Science 175.4025 (1972): 949–955.
 Friedmann, Theodore. "Progress toward human gene therapy." Science 244.4910 (1989): 1275–1281.

References

External links
PubMed search for Theodore Friedmann

1935 births
Living people
University of Pennsylvania alumni
World Anti-Doping Agency members
Alumni of the University of Oxford
University of California, San Diego faculty
American medical researchers
Austrian emigrants to the United States
20th-century American physicians
National Institutes of Health people